The Seac Pai Van line is a planned line of the Macau Light Rapid Transit. The line will operate as a shuttle between the existing East Asian Games station on the Taipa line and a station on the reclaimed land of Seac Pai Van. Further proposals have been made to extend the line further to Coloane Village.

References

Light rail in Macau